Calderys, a subsidiary of Imerys, is a multinational company specialized in producing heat resistant monolithic refractory products. Calderys is headquartered at Issy-Les-Moulineaux on the outskirts of Paris, with over 2,000 employees and 18 plants in more than 30 countries.

History 
William A.L. Schaefer, in 1914, developed the first monolithic refractory and created the Pliable Firebrick Company, which is also known as Plibrico.

Calderys was formed in 2005 by the merger of Plibrico International & Lafarge Refractories. Calderys expanded in Asia by acquiring ACE Refractories in India in 2007. Later next year in 2008, Svenska Silikaverken AB, a monolithic company active in Sweden, Norway and Finland, was acquired by Calderys, as well as Valöns, an important quartzite source in Åmål, Sweden. In early 2013, Calderys acquired Arefcon b.v., a refractory installation company based in the Netherlands, in order to reinforce the company's ability to deliver turn-key projects for the petrochemical industry. The company continued its expansion in Asia in 2013 by signing a joint venture agreement with PT Indoporlen, an Indonesian refractory manufacturer and service provider, as well as by acquiring Tokai Ceramics, a Japanese refractory producer. This acquisition marks the first time that Calderys has had local production in Japan. In the first quarter of 2014, Calderys acquired Termorak Group in Finland, a company that specialises in refractory services including lining design, installation work and inspections. This acquisition enables Calderys to strengthen its position in the petrochemical and pulp and paper industries, as well as in the power business in Finland, Russia, the Baltic countries and in southeast Asia.

R&D 
Research and Development is one of the major focus areas for Calderys. As a result of which Calderys is able to provide its customers a wide range of products, i.e. more than 1500 formulas. It has publications in top journals and conferences in the refractory industry.

Products  
Calderys specializes in monolithic refractories, especially for the iron and steel, foundry, cement, non-ferrous, and petrochemical industries. Calderys produces and installs these refractories, and also provides project management services for them.

External links 
 Calderys website

References 

Manufacturing companies of France